Rodrigo Adrián Schlegel (born 3 April 1997) is an Argentine professional footballer who plays as a centre-back for Major League Soccer club Orlando City.

Club career

Racing Club
Schlegel came through the youth system at Racing Club, transitioning from the U-20 side to Racing Club II in 2017 before making his senior debut on 2 December 2017, starting in a 2–2 draw against Newell's Old Boys.

Orlando City
On 23 December 2019, Schlegel signed a one-year loan deal with MLS side Orlando City ahead of the 2020 season. He made his debut on March 7, starting in a 2–1 defeat away to Colorado Rapids. It was his only appearance before the season was disrupted by the COVID-19 pandemic. Instead MLS held a World Cup-style tournament by way of the MLS is Back Tournament. Schlegel made three appearances during the competition, all as a substitute within the final 10 minutes of games in which Orlando were winning by a one-goal margin, entering as a third centre-back to help see out games. They won all three games in which he appeared.

An unused substitute in four of the first five games upon the return to regular season play, Schlegel was handed only his third start of the season against Florida rivals Inter Miami on September 12 and was caught up in controversy when he was temporarily sent off for a second yellow card and conceded a penalty. Initially not called, the disciplinary action came from VAR before a second consultation spotted an offside which negated the play. Despite the drama, Schlegel was not only noted for his strong defensive display but also his battling and passionate demeanor. As a result, he was trusted to start in four of the next five games with Orlando in the midst of a club record unbeaten streak before seeing out the season as a substitute.

On 21 November 2020, Orlando played their first MLS playoff game in history against New York City FC. With the score tied 1–1 in extra-time and Orlando playing down a man, Schlegel again substituted into a back three in the 101st minute to help see out the draw. The game went to a penalty shootout in which Schlegel served as an emergency goalkeeper after Pedro Gallese received a second yellow card for leaving his goal line early. Orlando initially attempted to make a substitution to bring in backup keeper Brian Rowe into the game with Schlegel coming off, however this substitution was eventually disallowed following a long delay. Schlegel allowed two successful penalties before making the decisive save against Guðmundur Þórarinsson, helping lift Orlando to a 6–5 win and a place in the conference semi-finals.

Schlegel had his loan move made permanent as part of the club's end of season roster moves on 2 December 2020.

Career statistics

Club

Honours
Racing Club
Superliga Argentina: 2018–19
Trofeo de Campeones de la Superliga Argentina: 2019

Orlando City
U.S. Open Cup: 2022

References

External links
 

1997 births
Living people
Argentine footballers
Argentine Primera División players
Argentine people of German descent
Racing Club de Avellaneda footballers
Orlando City SC players
Orlando City B players
Major League Soccer players
MLS Next Pro players
Association football central defenders
Argentine expatriate footballers
Expatriate soccer players in the United States
Argentine expatriate sportspeople in the United States
Outfield association footballers who played in goal
Sportspeople from Buenos Aires Province